Avenula is a genus of Eurasian flowering plants in the grass family. Over 100 names have been proposed for species, subspecies, varieties, and other infraspecific taxa within Avenula, but only one species is accepted. The others names are all regarded as synonyms of other accepted names. The only recognized species in the genus is Avenula pubescens, commonly known as downy oat-grass or downy alpine oatgrass, native to Europe and Asia from Iceland and Portugal to Xinjiang, Mongolia, and Siberia. It is also naturalized in scattered locations in North America, in states as Connecticut, Delaware, Minnesota, New Jersey and Vermont, and in Canadian provinces such as Alberta, Manitoba, Ontario, Quebec, and Saskatchewan.

Other genera containing species once included in Avenula: Helictochloa, Helictotrichon and Tricholemma.

See also 
 List of Poaceae genera

References 

Pooideae
Monotypic Poaceae genera
Flora of Asia
Flora of Canada
Flora of Europe
Flora of the United States